The 2017–8 DHB-Pokal was the 42nd edition of the tournament.

The Rhein-Neckar Löwen won their first title after a 30–26 finals win over TSV Hannover-Burgdorf.

Format
The first round was split in a north and a south part and played in mini tournaments where only the winner advanced to the round of 16. From there on a knockout system was used to determine the winner. The final four was played on one weekend in Hamburg.

Round 1
The draw was held on 20 June 2017. Games were played on 19 and 20 August 2017.

|-
|colspan=3 style="text-align:center;" |North
|-
|colspan=3 style="text-align:center;" |Played in Hildesheim

|-
|colspan=3 style="text-align:center;" |Played in Düsseldorf

|-
|colspan=3 style="text-align:center;" |Played in Hildesheim

|-
|colspan=3 style="text-align:center;" |Played in Altenholz

|-
|colspan=3 style="text-align:center;" |Played in Springe

|-
|colspan=3 style="text-align:center;" |Played in Spenge

|-
|colspan=3 style="text-align:center;" |Played in Minden

|-
|colspan=3 style="text-align:center;" |Played in Hagen

|-
|colspan=3 style="text-align:center;" |South
|-
|colspan=3 style="text-align:center;" |Played in Heilbronn-Horkheim

|-
|colspan=3 style="text-align:center;" |Played in Nußloch

|-
|colspan=3 style="text-align:center;" |Played in Pforzheim

|-
|colspan=3 style="text-align:center;" |Played in Großwallstadt

|-
|colspan=3 style="text-align:center;" |Played in Darmstadt

|-
|colspan=3 style="text-align:center;" |Played in Köndringen/Teningen

|-
|colspan=3 style="text-align:center;" |Played in Oftersheim/Schwetzingen

|-
|colspan=3 style="text-align:center;" |Played in Aue

|}

Round 2
The draw was held on 28 August 2017. Games were played on 17 and 18 October 2017.

|}

Quarterfinals
The draw was held on 5 November 2017. Games were played from 4 to 7 March 2018.

|}

Final four
The draw was held on 7 March 2018.

All times are local (UTC+2).

Bracket

Semifinals

Final

References

External links
Official website

2018